Damirchi (also Romanized as Damīrchī) is a village in Gavdul-e Sharqi Rural District, in the Central District of Malekan County, East Azerbaijan Province, Iran. At the 2006 census, its population was 1,018, in 229 families.

References 

Populated places in Malekan County